Vladimir Nikolaevich Belyaev (born September 24, 1940) is a former Russian weightlifter, World champion (1966) and Olympic medalist (1968) who competed for the Soviet Union.

He was born in Kiev.

Belyaev won a silver medal at the 1968 Summer Olympics in Mexico City.

References

External links
 
 

1940 births
Living people
Russian male weightlifters
Soviet male weightlifters
Olympic weightlifters of the Soviet Union
Weightlifters at the 1968 Summer Olympics
Olympic silver medalists for the Soviet Union
Olympic medalists in weightlifting
Medalists at the 1968 Summer Olympics